Maffeo Gherardi (1406–1492) (called the Cardinal of Venice) was an Italian Roman Catholic bishop and cardinal.

Maffeo Gherardi was born in Venice in 1406, the son of nobles Giovanni Gherardi and Cristina Barbarigo.

He entered the Camaldolese Order when young, receiving the habit from Paolo Venerio, Abbot of the Monastery of St. Michael on Murano.  Gherardi later became abbot of this monastery, and later Abbot General of the Camaldolese Order.

In April 1466, the Venetian Senate unanimously elected him to be the Patriarch of Venice.  Ambassadors of the Republic of Venice presented his selection to Pope Paul II on 31 October 1467 and the pope confirmed his appointment on 16 December 1468.  Gherardi subsequently held this position for the rest of his life. His chancellor for many years was Filippo da Rimini.

Pope Innocent VIII made him a cardinal priest in pectore in the consistory of 9 March 1489.  On 3 July 1489 the pope declared that his creation would be published in the next consistory at which cardinals were created, and that if the pope died before such a consistory, he would nevertheless be eligible to participate in the next Papal Conclave.  Following the death of Pope Innocent VIII, Gherardi traveled to Rome, then in the midst of a sede vacante, arriving on 3 August 1492.  At the insistence of the Venetian Council of Ten, the College of Cardinals published his creation as a cardinal and allowed him to participate in the papal conclave of 1492, where he cast the decisive vote in favor of Pope Alexander VI. He received as Titular church the  deaconry of Santi Sergio e Bacco.

On his way back to Venice, he died in Terni on 14 September 1492.  He is buried in San Pietro di Castello in Venice.

References

15th-century Italian cardinals
Patriarchs of Venice
1406 births
1492 deaths
15th-century Roman Catholic archbishops in the Republic of Venice